Batticaloa Hindu College is a provincial school in Batticaloa, Sri Lanka.

See also
 List of schools in Eastern Province, Sri Lanka

References

Educational institutions established in 1946
Provincial schools in Sri Lanka
Schools in Batticaloa
1946 establishments in Ceylon